The Poague House is a -story, three-bay, hall-parlor, dry-stone  house built in the first half of the 19th century by future Kentucky Governor, Thomas Metcalfe for William Poague.  The ashlar stone construction is of upper Ordovician fossiliferous limestone.  Window frames are pegged with ovolo trim, nosed sills, and 9-11 voussoirs with key the same height.  There is a dentilled cornice.

Trim throughout the house is Federal except the hall in which a Greek Revival mantel was added.  The doors are six panel with beaded diagonal battens on the inside.  There is an enclosed corner stair with an atypical plaster lining.

It was listed on the National Register of Historic Places in 1987.

It is located in Mason County, Kentucky, on the southeast side of Parker Lane, above Lees Creek, about 
past Mays Lick.

See also
List of buildings constructed by Thomas Metcalfe

References

Houses on the National Register of Historic Places in Kentucky
Houses in Mason County, Kentucky
National Register of Historic Places in Mason County, Kentucky
Thomas Metcalfe buildings
Stone houses in Kentucky
Federal architecture in Kentucky